Galaxy Ranger may refer to:

 Kyōryū Sentai Zyuranger, a 1992 Japanese tokusatsu television series (the title used for international distribution is Galaxy Rangers)
 The Adventures of the Galaxy Rangers, a 1986 American animated Space Western television series